Viktor Uzbek (born 22 February 1990 in Ukrainian SSR) is a professional Ukrainian football who plays for Moldovan club FC Iskra-Stal.

Career
Uzbek turned professional and played two games for PFC Sevastopol in the Ukrainian First League.

External links 
 Official Website Profile

1990 births
Living people
Ukrainian footballers
FC Sevastopol players
Ukrainian expatriate footballers
Expatriate footballers in Moldova
Association football defenders
FC Sevastopol (Russia) players